Tailgate Party is an album by American comedian Larry the Cable Guy. It was released by Warner Bros. Records on September 22, 2009. The album peaked at number 1 on the Billboard Top Comedy Albums chart.

Track listing
All material written by Larry the Cable Guy.
"Tailgate Party" – 3:59 
"Prostate Professional" – 3:47
"Half Cocked" – 3:59
"Boob Tube" – 4:15
"Truck Talk" – 3:53
"Male Enhancement" – 5:58
"Global Warming" – 3:41
"Wife Swap" – 3:38
"Mother's Milk" – 4:09
"Hot Dog Whisperer" – 4:00
"Bad Ventriloquist" – 4:09
"Buying in Bulk" – 2:22
"Silly Songs and So Long" – 4:48

Chart performance

References

2009 albums
Larry the Cable Guy albums
Warner Records albums
2000s comedy albums